Ulrich Willerding (born 8 July 1932 in Querfurt, Germany) is a professor emeritus of botany at the Göttingen University, Germany. He is also an instructor at a local high school.  Willerding is one of the leading European palaeo-ethnobotanists. He has specialized in Medieval Europe but also done work on other times. One of his special interests is weeds. He has worked on bibliographies of European paleoethnobotany. Although a biologist by training, he has worked extensively with archaeologists.

Selected publications
"Göttingen: II. Die Pflanzenreste aus der bandkeramischen Siedlung," NAFN II, 1965.
"Mittelalterliche Pflanzenreste von der Büraburg," in Burg – „Oppidum“ – Bischofssitz in karolingischer Zeit ed. by Norbert Wand, 1974.
Die Paläoethnobotanik und ihre Stellung im System der Wissenschaften (Berichte der Deutschen Botanischen Gesellschaft), 1978.
(Co-editor) Beiträge zur Paläo- Ethnobotanik von Europa. Contributions to the Palaeo- Ethnobotany of Europe, 1978.
Zur Geschichte der Unkräuter Mitteleuropas, 1986.
"Landnutzung und Ernährung,“ in: Göttingen: Geschichte einer Universitätsstadt Band 1: Von den Anfängen bis zum Ende des Dreißigjährigen Krieges / Dietrich Denecke,Helga-Maria Kühn (Hrsg.), 1987.
Frühmittelalterliche Gärten (Archäologische Mitteilungen aus Nordwestdeutschland), 1996.
"Zur Verwendung von Pflanzen im Hausbau des Mittelalters und während der Neuzeit,“ in: Terra & Praehistoria. Festschrift für K.-D. Jäger, 1996.
Umweltrekonstruktion (Archäologische Mitteilungen aus Nordwestdeutschland), 1996.
"Die Landwirtschaft bei den Germanen und in den römischen Provinzen bis zur Völkerwanderungszeit: Haustierhaltung” and "Die Landwirtschaft im frühen Mittelalter (6.-10.Jh.): Garten, Obst und Weinbau” – Archäologische Fachliteratur (Beiträge zur Ur- und Frühgeschichte Mitteleuropas ; 14), 2003.
Die Pflanzenfunde von Starigard/Oldenburg, 2004.

Frühe Nutzung pflanzlicher Ressourcen, ed. by Renate Rolle and Frank M. Andraschko (1999) is a festschrift dedicated to Willerding.

References

External links
Online article by Willerding concerning early agricultural production from pre-Roman through Medieval times (in German)

1932 births
Living people
People from Querfurt
People from the Province of Saxony
Ethnobiologists
21st-century American botanists
Ethnobotanists
Archaeobotanists
Academic staff of the University of Göttingen